Marcelline Basigayabo is a Rwandan politician, currently a member of the Chamber of Deputies in the Parliament of Rwanda.

References

Members of the Chamber of Deputies (Rwanda)
Living people
Year of birth missing (living people)
Place of birth missing (living people)